Liberal Gun Club is an American gun owners group composed primarily of people with modern liberal views. The group was founded in 2008 and has a pro-Second Amendment position on gun ownership.

Its mission statement states that “the mission of The Liberal Gun Club is to provide a pro-Second Amendment voice for left-of-center gun owners in the national conversations on firearms. In order to achieve our mission, we encourage new participants in the shooting sports and provide firearms safety and shooting instruction programs; as well as providing a forum for civil discourse on these issues.”

In regard to gun control, the group favors "root cause mitigation for violence prevention, stronger mental health care, addressing poverty, homelessness and unemployment rather than focusing on prohibiting or restricting one tool." They also generally oppose "assault weapon" bans, but individual members have a wide range of opinions. In 2014, the group had about 1,200 members. From 2016 to 2017, after the Orlando nightclub shooting and the 2016 United States presidential election, membership swelled 65% year over year and the group's Facebook and social media presence grew significantly as well. As of August 2019, the Liberal Gun Club claims to have over 11,500 supporters and more than 2,500 contributing members.

Chapters 
The Liberal Gun Club operates throughout the United States with Chapters on a state or regional level. As of June 2019, the Club had active chapters in New England, Texas, Arizona, Arkansas, Florida, Georgia, Illinois, Massachusetts, Michigan, Minnesota, Missouri, New Jersey, New York, North Carolina, Oklahoma, Oregon, Washington, Virginia/DC/Maryland, Wisconsin, Rocky Mountains, Tennessee,
and the "Flyover States" (which are states within a six-hour drive of Chicago, Illinois). Other chapters have been proposed. Members who do not belong to a regional Chapter participate in national and regional events. California is the largest chapter, with Oregon and Texas as the second and third largest chapters, respectively.

See also
Huey P. Newton Gun Club
Redneck Revolt
Socialist Rifle Association
Black Guns Matter

References

External links
 

Gun rights advocacy groups in the United States
Hobbyist organizations
Shooting sports in the United States
Liberalism in the United States
501(c)(4) nonprofit organizations